KothaBestaGudem is a village, also known as Kotha Mallur, in Mangapet, Jayashankar Bhupalpally district, Telangana, India.

KothaBestaGudem village is 140 km away from Hanamkonda. It is surrounded by forest.

References

Villages in Jayashankar Bhupalpally district